Skolnick is a surname, and may refer to:

Alex Skolnick (born 1968), American jazz and rock guitarist
Andrew A. Skolnick, science writer
Arnold Skolnick, American graphic artist and book publisher
Evan Skolnick, American writer
Jerome Herbert Skolnick, professor of criminology
Jeffrey Skolnick, American computational biologist
Maurice Skolnick FRS, British physicist on the Optoelectronics Committee for the Rank Prize
Phil Skolnick, American neuroscientist
Sherman Skolnick (1930 – 2006), political activist and conspiracy theorist

Jewish surnames
Slavic-language surnames